Kasauti (means Criterion) is an Indian film directed by Ramchandra Thakur released in 1941. The film also had Baby Meena (Meena Kumari) as a child artist.

Plot
A bridegroom unwittingly becomes the main suspect in a murder, when it appears he was the last person to see the female victim alive.

Cast
Meena Kumari ... Baby Meena
Rose         ... Madhuri
Prahlad     ... Raju 
Sunalini     ... Mother
Veena        ... Meena(Manjula)
Satish       ... Indu

References

1941 films
1940s Hindi-language films
Indian black-and-white films